Bertoldi is an Italian surname. Notable people with the surname include:

 Alberto Bertoldi (born 1955), Italian painter
 Aldo Bertoldi (born 1961), Swiss racewalker
 Carlos Augusto Bertoldi or simply Ticão (born 1985), Brazilian footballer
 Giovanni de Bertoldi, O.F.M. (died 1445), Roman Catholic prelate and Bishop of Fano
 Giovanni Bertoldi da Serravalle (c. 1350 – 1445), Italian Franciscan and humanist, bishop of Fermo and bishop of Fano 
 Luigi Bertoldi (1920–2001), Italian socialist politician 
 Marilina Bertoldi (born 1988), Argentinian singer-songwriter and guitarist
 Piergiorgio Bertoldi (born 1963), Catholic archbishop and Apostolic Nuncio of the Holy See
 

Surnames of South Tyrolean origin
Italian-language surnames